Gelechia lynceella is a moth of the family Gelechiidae. It is found in North America, where it has been recorded from Alberta, British Columbia, California, Illinois, Indiana, Maine, Manitoba, Mississippi, Nevada, New York, North Dakota, Ohio, Ontario, Quebec, Texas and Wyoming.

References

Moths described in 1873
Gelechia